Johannesudd is a locality situated in Vallentuna Municipality, Stockholm County, Sweden with 249 inhabitants in 2010.

References 

Populated places in Vallentuna Municipality